

0–9
188th Armored Brigade · 
1920 Nebi Musa riots · 
1929 Palestine riots · 
1948 Arab–Israeli War · 
1949 Armistice Agreements · 
1982 Lebanon War ·
1992 attack on Israeli embassy in Buenos Aires · 
2000 Camp David Summit · 
2004 attempt to revive the Sanhedrin · 
613 mitzvot · 
92nd Street Y

A
Av · 
Abaye · 
Abbahu · 
Abba Eban · 
Abba Arikha · 
Abishai · 
Abraham · 
Abraham ibn Ezra · 
Abraham Isaac Kook · 
Abraham Joshua Heschel · 
Absalom · 
Adar · 
Adonizedek · 
Aelia Capitolina · 
Afula · 
Agrippa · 
Ahad Ha'am · 
Akko, Israel · 
Albert Einstein · 
Alan Dershowitz · 
Aliyah · 
American Israel Public Affairs Committee (AIPAC) · 
American Jewish Joint Distribution Committee (JDC or "Joint") · 
Amidah · 
AMIA bombing · 
Amoraim · 
Amos (prophet) · 
Anne Frank · 
Anti-Defamation League · 
Antisemitic canard · 
Antisemitism · 
Antisemitism in Islam · 
Antisemitism in the Arab world · 
Anti-Zionism · 
Anti-Zionist Committee of the Soviet Public · 
Apostasy in Judaism · 
Arab al-Mawasi massacre · 
Arab–Israeli conflict · 
Arab–Israeli peace projects · 
Archaeology of Israel ·
Ariel Sharon · 
Ark of the Covenant · 
Armageddon · 
Arthur Koestler · 
Asher ben Jehiel · 
Ashi · 
Ashkelon · 
Ashkenazi Hasidim · 
Ashkenazi Jews · 
Auschwitz concentration camp · 
Avraham Stern · 
Azriel Hildesheimer

B
Baal Shem Tov · 
Baal teshuva movement · 
Babylonian captivity · 
Balaam · 
Balfour Declaration · 
Bar-Ilan University · 
Bar Kokhba · 
Bar Kokhba revolt · 
Baraita · 
Baruch Goldstein · 
Baruch Spinoza · 
Beersheba · 
Beit She'an · 
Beitar Illit · 
Bene Israel · 
Benny Morris · 
Benjamin Netanyahu · 
Beta Israel · 
Bethlehem · 
Bible · 
Bible code · 
Bible conspiracy theory · 
Biblical Mount Sinai · 
Bilu (movement) · 
Birobidzhan · 
Blood libel · 
Bnei Brak · 
B'nai B'rith · 
Book of Amos · 
Book of Daniel · 
Book of Deuteronomy · 
Book of Esther · 
Book of Ezekiel · 
Book of Ezra · 
Book of Haggai · 
Book of Jeremiah · 
Book of Lamentations · 
Book of Nahum · 
Book of Nehemiah · 
Book of Numbers · 
Books of Kings · 
Books of the Bible · 
Brit milah · 
British mandate of Palestine · 
B'Tselem

C
Canaan · 
Cantonist · 
Cantor · 
Camp David Accords · 
Carmeli Brigade · 
Carmelit · 
The Case for Israel · 
Cave of the Patriarchs · 
Cave of the Patriarchs massacre · 
Chabad · 
Chaim Herzog · 
Chaim Rumkowski · 
Chaim Weizmann · 
Cheshvan · 
Chosen people · 
Christian–Jewish reconciliation · 
Christian Zionism · 
Christianity and anti-Semitism · 
Churchill White Paper · 
Conference of Presidents of Major American Jewish Organizations · 
Conservative Judaism · 
Conversion to Judaism · 
Council of Four Lands · 
Culture of Israel

D
Dabru Emet · 
Damascus affair · 
Daniel · 
Daniel Lewin · 
Daniel Pipes · 
Dating the Bible · 
David · 
David Ben-Gurion · 
David Dragunsky · 
Deborah Lipstadt · 
Dead Sea Scrolls · 
Deir Yassin massacre · 
Dershowitz–Finkelstein affair · 
Dhimmi ·  
Dimona · 
Disputation · 
Doctors' plot · 
Documentary hypothesis · 
Dor Daim · 
Dreyfus affair · 
Druze · 
Dushanbe Synagogue

E
Egypt–Israel peace treaty · 
Ehud Barak · 
Eilat ·
Ein Ayala · 
Eli Cohen · 
Elie Wiesel · 
Eli Yishai · 
Eliezer Ben-Yehuda · 
Elijah · 
Elul · 
Elyakim Rubinstein · 
Emil Fackenheim · 
Esther · 
Etrog · 
Jew (word) · 
Exilarch · 
Exodus · 
Expulsions and exoduses of Jews · 
Ezekiel · 
Ezra

F
Faisal–Weizmann Agreement · 
First Jewish–Roman War · 
From Time Immemorial

G
Galilee · 
Gaza · 
Gemara · 
General Jewish Labour Bund · 
Genesis · 
Geography of Israel · 
Gersonides · 
Ghetto · 
Ghetto Fighters' House · 
Givatayim · 
Givati Brigade · 
Glückel of Hameln · 
Golan Heights · 
Golani Brigade · 
Golda Meir · 
Golden age of Jewish culture in Spain · 
Green Line ·
Gulf War · 
Gush Dan

H
Haaretz · 
Habakkuk · 
Habima Theatre · 
Hadassah Women's Zionist Organization of America · 
Hadassah medical convoy massacre · 
Hadera · 
Haganah · 
Haggadah · 
Haggai · 
Haifa · 
Halakha · 
Hanukkah · 
Haredi Judaism · 
Harry Oppenheimer · 
Haskalah · 
Hasideans · 
Hasidic Judaism · 
Hatikvah · 
Haym Salomon · 
Hebrew alphabet · 
Hebrew Bible · 
Hebrew calendar · 
Hebrew language · 
Hebrew name · 
Hebrew numerals · 
Hebrew University of Jerusalem · 
Hebron · 
Hechsher · 
Heinrich Graetz · 
Herschel Grynszpan · 
Herzliya · 
Hezekiah · 
Histadrut · 
Historical Jewish population comparisons · 
Historicity of the Bible · 
History of ancient Israel and Judah · 
History of antisemitism · 
History of European Jews in the Middle Ages · 
History of Israel · 
History of Jerusalem · 
History of Jewish education in the United States before the 20th century · 
History of Palestine · 
History of responsa in Judaism · 
History of the Israel Defense Forces · 
History of the Jews and Judaism in the Land of Israel · 
History of the Jews under Muslim rule · 
The Holocaust · 
Holocaust denial · 
Holocaust theology · 
Holy Land · 
Holy of Holies · 
Homeland for the Jewish people · 
Hope Simpson Enquiry · 
Hovevei Zion · 
Hosea · 
Hurva Synagogue

I
Ilan Ramon · 
Immanuel the Roman · 
IMI Systems · 
Jewish exodus from Arab and Muslim countries · 
Intifada (First) · 
Intifada (Second) · 
Irgun ·  
Irv Rubin · 
Isaac · 
Isaac Abarbanel · 
Isaac Klein · 
Isaac Luria · 
Isaiah · 
Islamic–Jewish relations · 
Israel · 
Israel Border Police · 
Israel Central Bureau of Statistics ·
Israel–Jordan peace treaty · 
Israel Shahak · 
Israel Zangwill · 
Israel's Border Wars 1949–1956 · 
Israeli Air Force · 
Israeli Declaration of Independence · 
Israeli Defense Forces · 
Israeli Labor Party · 
Israeli new shekel · 
Israeli settlement · 
Israeli special forces units · 
Israel–Gaza barrier · 
Israeli–Lebanese conflict · 
Israeli–Palestinian conflict · 
Israeli–Palestinian peace process · 
Israeli West Bank barrier · 
Israelites · 
Itzik Feffer · 
Iyar

J
Jackson–Vanik amendment · 
Jacob · 
Jacob ben Asher (Baal ha-Turim) · 
Jacob Frank · 
Jacobi, Carl Gustav · 
Jaffa riots · 
Jeconiah · 
Jeremiah · 
Jericho · 
Jerusalem · 
Jerusalem Law · 
The Jerusalem Post · 
Jew (word) · 
Jewish Anti-Fascist Committee · 
Jewish Autonomism · 
Jewish Autonomous Oblast · 
Jewish Community Center · 
Jewish Council for Public Affairs · 
Jewish Defense League · 
Jewish diaspora · 
Jewish emancipation · 
Jewish eschatology · 
Jewish history · 
Jewish holidays · 
Jewish Institute for National Security of America ·
Jewish insurgency in Mandatory Palestine · 
Jewish languages · 
Jewish Legion · 
Jewish letter carriers ·
Jewish mythology · 
Jewish National Council · 
Jewish partisans · 
Jewish political movements · 
Jewish population by country · 
Jewish prayer · 
Jewish principles of faith · 
Jewish religious movements · 
Jewish–Roman wars · 
Jewish schisms · 
Jewish symbolism · 
Jewish Theological Seminary of America · 
Jewish Theological Seminary of Breslau · 
Jewish views on marriage · 
Jewish views on religious pluralism · 
Jews · 
Jews as the chosen people · 
Joab · 
Joel · 
Jonah · 
Josel of Rosheim · 
Joseph (Genesis) · 
Joseph B. Soloveitchik · 
Joseph Karo
Joseph Trumpeldor · 
Josephus · 
Joshua · 
Jubilee (biblical) · 
Judah · 
Judah ha-Nasi · 
Judah Loew ben Bezalel · 
Judah P. Benjamin · 
Judaism · 
Judas Maccabeus · 
Judea and Samaria Area · 
Judaeo-Spanish · 
Judeo-Arabic languages · 
Judeo-Aramaic languages · 
Judeo-Berber language · 
Judensau · 
Judges

K
Kabbalah · 
Kach and Kahane Chai · 
Kafr Qasim massacre · 
Kahanism · 
Kaifeng Jews · 
Karaite Judaism · 
Karine A affair · 
Kashrut · 
Kfar Etzion massacre · 
Kfar Saba · 
Kibbutz · 
Kielce pogrom · 
King David Hotel bombing · 
Kingdom of Israel · 
Kingdom of Judah · 
Kiryat Shmona
Kishinev pogrom · 
Kislev · 
Kitniyot · 
Klezmer · 
Knesset · 
Kohen · 
Kristallnacht

L
Lamentations · 
Land for peace · 
Land of Israel · 
Lavon Affair · 
Leah Goldberg · 
Lehi (militant group) · 
Leviticus · 
Liberal Judaism · 
Likud · 
Lina Stern · 
List of aircraft of the Israeli Air Force · 
List of battles and operations in the 1948 Palestine war ·
List of biblical names · 
List of cities in Israel · 
List of Hebrew Bible events · 
List of Israeli universities and colleges · 
List of Jewish ethnonyms · 
List of newspapers in Israel · 
List of places in Jerusalem · 
List of United Nations resolutions concerning Israel · 
List of violent incidents in the Israeli–Palestinian conflict, 2000 · 
List of violent incidents in the Israeli–Palestinian conflict, 2001 · 
List of violent incidents in the Israeli–Palestinian conflict, 2002 · 
List of violent incidents in the Israeli–Palestinian conflict, 2003 · 
List of violent incidents in the Israeli–Palestinian conflict, 2004 · 
List of Zionists · 
Lists of Jews · 
Lod Airport massacre ·

M
Ma'alot massacre · 
Maariv · 
Maccabees · 
Madrid Conference of 1991 · 
Madrid peace conference letter of invitation · 
Maimonides  · 
Malachi · 
Marrano · 
Martin Buber · 
Martin Luther · 
Martin Luther and antisemitism · 
Marx, Karl · 
Masada · 
Masoretes · 
Masoretic Text · 
Matzo · 
Mawza Exile · 
Max Nordau · 
Meir Kahane · 
Mel Mermelstein · 
Menachem Begin · 
Menahem Mendel Beilis · 
Menachem Mendel Schneerson · 
Merkava · 
Messiah · 
Messianic Judaism · 
Mesillat Yesharim · 
Mezuzah · 
Micah · 
Michael Dov Weissmandl · 
Mickey Marcus · 
Midrash · 
Mishnah · 
Modern Orthodox Judaism · 
Moledet · 
Mordecai Anielewicz · 
Mordecai Kaplan · 
Mordechai Vanunu · 
Moriah · 
Mormonism and Judaism · 
Mortara case ·
Moscow State Jewish Theatre · 
Moses · 
Moshe Chaim Luzzatto · 
Moses Mendelssohn · 
Moses Montefiore · 
Moshav · 
Mossad · 
Mount of Olives · 
Mount Scopus · 
Mount Sinai · 
Moshe Carmel · 
Moshe Dayan · 
Moshe Sharett · 
Moshe Ya'alon · 
MS St. Louis · 
Munich massacre · 
Musar movement

N
Nachmanides  · 
Nahal Brigade · 
Nahariya · 
Nahum · 
Names of Jerusalem · 
Nashim · 
Nathan Mayer Rothschild · 
Nathan (prophet) · 
National Religious Party · 
Nazareth · 
Near Eastern archaeology · 
Negev · 
Nehemiah · 
Netanya · 
Neturei Karta · 
New Historians · 
Niels Bohr · 
Nisan · 
Nizkor Project · 
Noah's Ark · 
Noam Chomsky · 
Norman Finkelstein · 
Norman Lamm · 
Nosson Tzvi Finkel · 
Nuremberg Laws

O
Obadiah · 
Odessa Committee · 
Old City (Jerusalem) · 
Old Synagogue (Erfurt) ·
Old Testament · 
On the Jews and Their Lies · 
Operation Defensive Shield · 
Operation Entebbe · 
Oral Torah · 
Orthodox Judaism · 
Oslo Accords · 
Oslo I Accord · 
Ovadia Yosef · 
OZET

P
Pale of Settlement · 
Palestine · 
Palestinian exodus · 
Palestinian political violence · 
Palmach · 
Paradesi Jews · 
Paratroopers Brigade · 
Passover massacre · 
Patriarchal age · 
Peace Now ·
Peel Commission · 
Persian Jews · 
Passover · 
Petah Tikva · 
Pharisees · 
Plan Dalet · 
Pogrom · 
Polina Zhemchuzhina · 
Population groups in Israel · 
Primeval history · 
Promised Land · 
Protocols of the Elders of Zion · 
Purim · 
Psalms

Q
Qibya massacre ·

R
Ra'anana · 
Rabbi · 
Rabbi Akiva · 
Rabbinical Assembly · 
Rabbinic authority · 
Rabbinic literature · 
Ramat Gan · 
Rashi · 
Reconstructionist Judaism · 
Reform Judaism · 
Rehavam Ze'evi · 
Rehoboam · 
Rehovot · 
Relationship of American Jews to the U.S. Federal Government before the 20th century · 
Relationships between Jewish religious movements · 
Religious significance of Jerusalem · 
Religious Zionism · 
Rescue of the Danish Jews · 
Right to exist · 
Rishon LeZion · 
Robert Fisk · 
Rootless cosmopolitan · 
Rosh Hashanah · 
Ruth

S
Saadia Gaon · 
Sabbatai Zevi · 
Sabbath · 
Safed · 
Saharon Shelah · 
Samaria · 
Samaritans · 
Samuel · 
San Remo conference · 
Sanhedrin · 
Saul · 
Saul Lieberman · 
Savoraim · 
Science and technology in Israel · 
Sderot · 
Second Temple · 
Secular Jewish culture · 
Seder · 
Semitic people · 
Sephardi Jews · 
Sephardic Haredim · 
Sephardic music · 
Septuagint · 
Seventeenth of Tammuz · 
Shavuot · 
Shayetet 13 · 
Shebaa farms · 
Shemini Atzeret · 
Sh'erit ha-Pletah · 
Shevat · 
Shimon Peres · 
Shin Bet  · 
Shiva · 
Shmuel HaNavi bus bombing · 
Shmuel Yosef Agnon · 
Shneur Zalman of Liadi · 
Shofar · 
Sholem Aleichem · 
Shtadlan · 
Shtetl · 
Shulchan Aruch · 
Sicarii · 
Siddur · 
Simon bar Kokhba ·  
Simon Dubnow · 
Simon Wiesenthal · 
Simon Wiesenthal Center · 
Sivan · 
Six-Day War · 
Slánský trial · 
Solomon · 
Solomon's Temple · 
Solomon Mikhoels · 
Solomon Schechter · 
Soviet anti-Zionism · 
Star of David · 
Suez Crisis · 
Sukkot · 
Sykes–Picot Agreement · 
Władysław Szpilman ·

T
Ta'anit · 
Tabernacle · 
Tallit · 
Talmud · 
Tammuz · 
Tannaim · 
Tanya Reinhart · 
Targum · 
Technion – Israel Institute of Technology · 
Tel Aviv · 
Tel Hai · 
Tel Lachish · 
Temple in Jerusalem · 
Temple Mount · 
Ten Commandments · 
Tenth of Tevet · 
Tevet · 
Tevye · 
The Black Book of Soviet Jewry · 
Theodor Herzl · 
Tiberias · 
Timeline of Jerusalem · 
Timeline of Jewish history · 
Timeline of the Israeli–Palestinian conflict · 
Timeline of Zionism · 
Tisha B'Av · 
Tishrei · 
Torah · 
Tosefta · 
Trans-Israel pipeline · 
Tribe of Asher · 
Tribe of Benjamin · 
Tribe of Dan · 
Tribe of Ephraim · 
Tribe of Gad · 
Tribe of Issachar · 
Tribe of Joseph · 
Tribe of Judah · 
Tribe of Levi · 
Tribe of Manasseh ·  
Tribe of Naphtali · 
Tribe of Reuben · 
Tribe of Simeon · 
Tribe of Zebulun · 
Tuqu' · 
Twelve Minor Prophets ·

U
UN Security Council Resolution 242 · 
UN Security Council Resolution 338 · 
UN Security Council Resolution 425 · 
UN Security Council Resolution 478 · 
United Nations General Assembly Resolution 3379 · 
United Nations Partition Plan for Palestine · 
United Torah Judaism · 
Uri Avnery · 
Useful Jew · 
Uzi

V
Valley of Rephaim · 
Vasily Grossman · 
Vilna Gaon ·

W
Waldemar Haffkine · 
War of Attrition · 
West Bank · 
Western Wall · 
White Paper of 1939 · 
Who is a Jew? · 
World Jewish Congress

Y
Yamam · 
Yavne · 
Yedioth Ahronoth · 
Yehoshua Porath · 
Yehuda Bauer · 
Yehuda Halevi · 
Yellow badge · 
Yemenite Jews · 
Yesha · 
Yeshiva · 
Yeshiva University · 
Yevsektsiya · 
Yiddish · 
Yiftach Brigade · 
Yigal Allon · 
Yigal Amir · 
Yishuv · 
Yisrael Meir Kagan · 
Yitzhak Rabin · 
Yitzhak Shamir · 
Yohanan ben Zakkai · 
Yom Kippur · 
Yom Kippur War · 
Yonatan Netanyahu · 
Yosef Yitzchak Schneersohn ·

Z
Zadok · 
ZAKA · 
Zealots · 
Zechariah (Hebrew prophet) · 
Zechariah ben Jehoiada · 
Zechariah of Israel · 
Zephaniah · 
Ze'ev Jabotinsky · 
Zikhron Ya'akov · 
Zion · 
Zionism · 
Zohar

Jewish history
Jewish history topics
Index
Judaism-related lists